Jennifer Lynn Wasner (born April 16, 1986) is an American musician from Baltimore. Wasner is best known as one of the founding members of the band Wye Oak, along with Andy Stack. They have performed on tour with notable bands such as The National and The Decemberists. Wasner has completed numerous other music projects as well, including a solo project entitled Flock of Dimes, and a collaboration called Dungeonesse with Jon Ehrens of White Life and Art Department.

Early life
Wasner was born on April 16, 1986, in Baltimore. She began singing at an early age with her mother and started taking classical piano lessons at about the age of five. At the age of twelve her mother taught her how to play guitar, which led to the beginning of her songwriting career. By high school, Wasner had met Andy Stack, and begun playing music with him. She continued to write music while away at college.

Music career

After college Wasner moved to the Hampden neighborhood of Baltimore. She and Stack formed a band with the name "Monarch", which was soon changed to Wye Oak after the state tree of Maryland. After the release of their highly regarded album Civilian in 2011, the group toured in the United States and Europe. Civilian was named the best album of 2011 by The A.V. Club, and was featured on television in the popular series The Walking Dead and in the film, Safety Not Guaranteed.  She also appeared on Titus Andronicus's 2010 album, "The Monitor" lending her vocals to the track, "To Old Friends and New".

When Wasner returned to Maryland in 2012 after touring with Dirty Projectors, she began work on the solo project, "Flock of Dimes" which experimented with new synths and electronic beats. The next year, she worked with Jon Ehrens of the Baltimore-pop group, White Life, on a new project labeled Dungeonesse.

Stack and Wasner reunited to create the fifth major album Shriek, released in April 2014.

In 2016, Wasner was featured in a new concert series taking place at the Baltimore–Washington International Airport, where she will perform at the baggage claim of the terminal.

In 2019, it was announced that Wasner would join Bon Iver, playing in the band for their autumn tour.

Discography

Dungeonesse
Dungeonesse – 2013

Flock of Dimes

Studio albums
If You See Me, Say Yes – (2016, Partisan Records)
Like So Much Desire (EP) - (2020, Sub Pop)
Head of Roses – (2021, Sub Pop)
Head of Roses: Phantom Limb – (2022, Sub Pop)

Singles

Wye Oak

Studio albums
If Children (2007, self-released; 2008, Merge Records) 
The Knot (2009, Merge Records)
Civilian (2011, Merge Records)
Shriek (2014, Merge Records)
Tween (2016, Merge Records)
The Louder I Call, The Faster It Runs (2018, Merge Records)
Cut All The Wires: 2009-2011 (2021, Merge Records)

Singles and EPs
Destroyer / Wye Oak split 7-inch single with Destroyer (2008, Merge Records)
My Neighbor / My Creator 12-inch/CD EP (2010, Merge Records)
"Strangers" 7-inch single (2011, Merge Records)
"Spiral" digital single (2011, Adult Swim)
"Trigger Finger" 7-inch single (2015, Joyful Noise Recordings)
No Horizon EP (2020, Merge Records)

Personal life
Wasner has lived in Durham, North Carolina since she moved from her native city of Baltimore in 2015.

References

Living people
1986 births
Dirty Projectors members
Musicians from Baltimore
Singers from Maryland
Musical groups from Baltimore
People from Owings Mills, Maryland
People from Baltimore
People from Durham, North Carolina
21st-century American singers
21st-century American women singers